A dart gun is a non-lethal air gun that shoots a dart containing a tranquilizer, vaccine, or antibiotic.

Dart gun may also refer to:
 Blowgun, a ranged weapon consisting of a long narrow tube for shooting light projectiles such as darts
 Crossbow, a ranged weapon using an elastic launching device consisting of a bow-like assembly, mounted horizontally on a main frame, which is hand-held in a similar fashion to the stock of a long gun
 Needlegun, a firearm that fires small, sometimes fin-stabilized, metal darts or flechettes
 Nerf Blaster, a toy gun made by Hasbro that fires foam darts

See also
 Dart (disambiguation)
 Needle gun (disambiguation)